Yeylaqi may refer to:
 Yeylaqi-ye Darestan
 Yeylaqi-ye Lakeh